In frequentist statistics, a confidence interval (CI) is a range of estimates for an unknown parameter. A confidence interval is computed at a designated confidence level; the 95% confidence level is most common, but other levels, such as 90% or 99%, are sometimes used. The confidence level represents the long-run proportion of CIs (at the given confidence level) that theoretically contain the true value of the parameter. For example, out of all intervals computed at the 95% level, 95% of them should contain the parameter's true value.

Factors affecting the width of the CI include the sample size, the variability in the sample, and the confidence level. All else being the same, a larger sample produces a narrower confidence interval, greater variability in the sample produces a wider confidence interval, and a higher confidence level produces a wider confidence interval.

Definition 
 

The number , whose typical value is close to but not greater than 1, is sometimes given in the form  (or as a percentage ), where  is a small positive number, often 0.05 .

Approximate confidence intervals 
In many applications, confidence intervals that have exactly the required confidence level are hard to construct, but approximate intervals can be computed. The rule for constructing the interval may be accepted as providing a confidence interval at level  if

 

to an acceptable level of approximation. Alternatively, some authors simply require that

 

which is useful if the probabilities are only partially identified or imprecise, and also when dealing with discrete distributions. Confidence limits of form

  and 

are called conservative; accordingly, one speaks of conservative confidence intervals and, in general, regions.

Desired properties 
When applying standard statistical procedures, there will often be standard ways of constructing confidence intervals. These will have been devised so as to meet certain desirable properties, which will hold given that the assumptions on which the procedure relies are true. These desirable properties may be described as: validity, optimality, and invariance.

Of the three, "validity" is most important, followed closely by "optimality". "Invariance" may be considered as a property of the method of derivation of a confidence interval, rather than of the rule for constructing the interval. In non-standard applications, these same desirable properties would be sought:

Validity
This means that the nominal coverage probability (confidence level) of the confidence interval should hold, either exactly or to a good approximation.

Optimality
This means that the rule for constructing the confidence interval should make as much use of the information in the data-set as possible.

Recall that one could throw away half of a dataset and still be able to derive a valid confidence interval. One way of assessing optimality is by the length of the interval so that a rule for constructing a confidence interval is judged better than another if it leads to intervals whose lengths are typically shorter.

Invariance
In many applications, the quantity being estimated might not be tightly defined as such.

For example, a survey might result in an estimate of the median income in a population, but it might equally be considered as providing an estimate of the logarithm of the median income, given that this is a common scale for presenting graphical results. It would be desirable that the method used for constructing a confidence interval for the median income would give equivalent results when applied to constructing a confidence interval for the logarithm of the median income: Specifically the values at the ends of the latter interval would be the logarithms of the values at the ends of former interval.

Methods of derivation 
For non-standard applications, there are several routes that might be taken to derive a rule for the construction of confidence intervals. Established rules for standard procedures might be justified or explained via several of these routes. Typically a rule for constructing confidence intervals is closely tied to a particular way of finding a point estimate of the quantity being considered.

Summary statistics

This is closely related to the method of moments for estimation. A simple example arises where the quantity to be estimated is the population mean, in which case a natural estimate is the sample mean. Similarly, the sample variance can be used to estimate the population variance. A confidence interval for the true mean can be constructed centered on the sample mean with a width which is a multiple of the square root of the sample variance.

Likelihood theory
Estimates can be constructed using the maximum likelihood principle, the likelihood theory for this provides two ways of constructing confidence intervals or confidence regions for the estimates.

Estimating equations
The estimation approach here can be considered as both a generalization of the method of moments and a generalization of the maximum likelihood approach. There are corresponding generalizations of the results of maximum likelihood theory that allow confidence intervals to be constructed based on estimates derived from estimating equations.

Hypothesis testing
If hypothesis tests are available for general values of a parameter, then confidence intervals/regions can be constructed by including in the  confidence region all those points for which the hypothesis test of the null hypothesis that the true value is the given value is not rejected at a significance level of

Bootstrapping

In situations where the distributional assumptions for the above methods are uncertain or violated, resampling methods allow construction of confidence intervals or prediction intervals. The observed data distribution and the internal correlations are used as the surrogate for the correlations in the wider population.

Central limit theorem

The central limit theorem is a refinement of the law of large numbers.

Example 
Suppose {X1, …, Xn} is an independent sample from a normally distributed population with unknown parameters mean μ and variance σ2. Let

 

 

Where  is the sample mean, and S2 is the sample variance. Then

 

has a Student's t distribution with n − 1 degrees of freedom. Note that the distribution of T does not depend on the values of the unobservable parameters μ and σ2; i.e., it is a pivotal quantity. Suppose we wanted to calculate a 95% confidence interval for μ. Then, denoting c as the 97.5th percentile of this distribution,

 

Note that "97.5th" and "0.95" are correct in the preceding expressions.

Consequently,

 

and we have a theoretical (stochastic) 95% confidence interval for μ.

Interpretation 

Various interpretations of a confidence interval can be given (taking the 95% confidence interval as an example in the following).
 The confidence interval can be expressed in terms of a long-run frequency in repeated samples (or in resampling): "Were this procedure to be repeated on numerous samples, the proportion of calculated 95% confidence intervals that encompassed the true value of the population parameter would tend toward 95%."
 The confidence interval can be expressed in terms of probability with respect to a single theoretical (yet to be realized) sample: "There is a 95% probability that the 95% confidence interval calculated from a given future sample will cover the true value of the population parameter."  This essentially reframes the "repeated samples" interpretation as a probability rather than a frequency. See Neyman construction.
 The confidence interval can be expressed in terms of statistical significance, e.g.: "The 95% confidence interval represents values that are not statistically significantly different from the point estimate at the .05 level".

Common misunderstandings 

Confidence intervals and levels are frequently misunderstood, and published studies have shown that even professional scientists often misinterpret them.

 A 95% confidence level does not mean that for a given realized interval there is a 95% probability that the population parameter lies within the interval (i.e., a 95% probability that the interval covers the population parameter). According to the strict frequentist interpretation, once an interval is calculated, this interval either covers the parameter value or it does not; it is no longer a matter of probability. The 95% probability relates to the reliability of the estimation procedure, not to a specific calculated interval. Neyman himself (the original proponent of confidence intervals) made this point in his original paper:It will be noticed that in the above description, the probability statements refer to the problems of estimation with which the statistician will be concerned in the future. In fact, I have repeatedly stated that the frequency of correct results will tend to α. Consider now the case when a sample is already drawn, and the calculations have given [particular limits]. Can we say that in this particular case the probability of the true value [falling between these limits] is equal to α? The answer is obviously in the negative. The parameter is an unknown constant, and no probability statement concerning its value may be made...

Deborah Mayo expands on this further as follows:It must be stressed, however, that having seen the value [of the data], Neyman–Pearson theory never permits one to conclude that the specific confidence interval formed covers the true value of 0 with either (1 − α)100% probability or (1 − α)100% degree of confidence. Seidenfeld's remark seems rooted in a (not uncommon) desire for Neyman–Pearson confidence intervals to provide something which they cannot legitimately provide; namely, a measure of the degree of probability, belief, or support that an unknown parameter value lies in a specific interval. Following Savage (1962), the probability that a parameter lies in a specific interval may be referred to as a measure of final precision. While a measure of final precision may seem desirable, and while confidence levels are often (wrongly) interpreted as providing such a measure, no such interpretation is warranted. Admittedly, such a misinterpretation is encouraged by the word 'confidence'.
 A 95% confidence level does not mean that 95% of the sample data lie within the confidence interval.
 A confidence interval is not a definitive range of plausible values for the sample parameter, though it is often heuristically taken as a range of plausible values.
 A particular confidence level of 95% calculated from an experiment does not mean that there is a 95% probability of a sample parameter from a repeat of the experiment falling within this interval.

Counterexamples 

Since confidence interval theory was proposed, a number of counter-examples to the theory have been developed to show how the interpretation of confidence intervals can be problematic, at least if one interprets them naïvely.

Confidence procedure for uniform location 

Welch presented an example which clearly shows the difference between the theory of confidence intervals and other theories of interval estimation (including Fisher's fiducial intervals and objective Bayesian intervals). Robinson called this example "[p]ossibly the best known counterexample for Neyman's version of confidence interval theory." To Welch, it showed the superiority of confidence interval theory; to critics of the theory, it shows a deficiency. Here we present a simplified version.

Suppose that  are independent observations from a Uniform(θ − 1/2, θ + 1/2) distribution.

 

A fiducial or objective Bayesian argument can be used to derive the interval estimate
 
which is also a 50% confidence procedure. Welch showed that the first confidence procedure dominates the second, according to desiderata from confidence interval theory; for every , the probability that the first procedure contains  is less than or equal to the probability that the second procedure contains . The average width of the intervals from the first procedure is less than that of the second. Hence, the first procedure is preferred under classical confidence interval theory.

However, when , intervals from the first procedure are guaranteed to contain the true value : Therefore, the nominal 50% confidence coefficient is unrelated to the uncertainty we should have that a specific interval contains the true value. The second procedure does not have this property.

Moreover, when the first procedure generates a very short interval, this indicates that  are very close together and hence only offer the information in a single data point. Yet the first interval will exclude almost all reasonable values of the parameter due to its short width. The second procedure does not have this property.

The two counter-intuitive properties of the first procedure—100% coverage when  are far apart and almost 0% coverage when  are close together—balance out to yield 50% coverage on average. However, despite the first procedure being optimal, its intervals offer neither an assessment of the precision of the estimate nor an assessment of the uncertainty one should have that the interval contains the true value.

This counter-example is used to argue against naïve interpretations of confidence intervals. If a confidence procedure is asserted to have properties beyond that of the nominal coverage (such as relation to precision, or a relationship with Bayesian inference), those properties must be proved; they do not follow from the fact that a procedure is a confidence procedure.

Confidence procedure for ω2 

Steiger suggested a number of confidence procedures for common effect size measures in ANOVA. Morey et al. point out that several of these confidence procedures, including the one for ω2, have the property that as the F statistic becomes increasingly small—indicating misfit with all possible values of ω2—the confidence interval shrinks and can even contain only the single value ω2 = 0; that is, the CI is infinitesimally narrow (this occurs when  for a  CI).

This behavior is consistent with the relationship between the confidence procedure and significance testing: as F becomes so small that the group means are much closer together than we would expect by chance, a significance test might indicate rejection for most or all values of ω2. Hence the interval will be very narrow or even empty (or, by a convention suggested by Steiger, containing only 0). However, this does not indicate that the estimate of ω2 is very precise. In a sense, it indicates the opposite: that the trustworthiness of the results themselves may be in doubt. This is contrary to the common interpretation of confidence intervals that they reveal the precision of the estimate.

History 
Confidence intervals were introduced by Jerzy Neyman in 1937. Statisticians quickly took to the idea, but adoption by scientists was more gradual. Some authors in medical journals promoted confidence intervals as early as the 1970s. Despite this, confidence intervals were rarely used until the following decade, when they quickly became standard. By the late 1980s, medical journals began to require the reporting of confidence intervals.

See also 
 
68–95–99.7 rule
Confidence band, an interval estimate for a curve

, a higher dimensional generalization

Credible interval, a Bayesian alternative for interval estimation

 
 
Margin of error, the CI halfwidth
 
Prediction interval, an interval estimate for a random variable
Probable error

Confidence interval for specific distributions 
 Confidence interval for binomial distribution
 Confidence interval for exponent of the power law distribution
 Confidence interval for mean of the exponential distribution
 Confidence interval for mean of the Poisson distribution
 Confidence intervals for mean and variance of the normal distribution

References

Bibliography 

 Fisher, R.A. (1956) Statistical Methods and Scientific Inference. Oliver and Boyd, Edinburgh. (See p. 32.)
 Freund, J.E. (1962) Mathematical Statistics Prentice Hall, Englewood Cliffs, NJ. (See pp. 227–228.)
 Hacking, I. (1965) Logic of Statistical Inference. Cambridge University Press, Cambridge. 
 Keeping, E.S. (1962) Introduction to Statistical Inference. D. Van Nostrand, Princeton, NJ.
 
 Mayo, D. G. (1981) "In defence of the Neyman–Pearson theory of confidence intervals", Philosophy of Science, 48 (2), 269–280. 
 Neyman, J. (1937) "Outline of a Theory of Statistical Estimation Based on the Classical Theory of Probability" Philosophical Transactions of the Royal Society of London A, 236, 333–380. (Seminal work.)
 
 Savage, L. J. (1962), The Foundations of Statistical Inference. Methuen, London.
 Smithson, M. (2003) Confidence intervals. Quantitative Applications in the Social Sciences Series, No. 140. Belmont, CA: SAGE Publications. .

 Mehta, S. (2014) Statistics Topics

External links 

 The Exploratory Software for Confidence Intervals tutorial programs that run under Excel
 Confidence interval calculators for R-Squares, Regression Coefficients, and Regression Intercepts
 
 CAUSEweb.org Many resources for teaching statistics including Confidence Intervals.
 An interactive introduction to Confidence Intervals
 Confidence Intervals: Confidence Level, Sample Size, and Margin of Error by Eric Schulz, the Wolfram Demonstrations Project.
 Confidence Intervals in Public Health. Straightforward description with examples and what to do about small sample sizes or rates near 0.

Statistical intervals